Nennal is a Mandal in Mancherial district in the state of Telangana in India.

Administrative divisions
There are 21 villages in Nennal

References 

Mandals in Adilabad district